Dubu-kimchi is a Korean dish consisting of tofu (dubu) and stir-fried kimchi. Soft, warm, blanched tofu is served with well-fermented, tangy baechu-kimchi (napa cabbage kimchi) stir-fried with pork, makes a well-matched anju (accompaniments to alcoholic drinks) for either soju or makgeolli.

Preparation 
Well-fermented baechu-kimchi (napa cabbage kimchi) is sliced into bite size pieces, while the pork is sliced into similar shape and size of kimchi and marinated with gochujang, soy sauce, gochutgaru (chili powder), grated ginger, minced garlic, and sugar. Onions are sliced into strips, and green chili peppers are sliced on the diagonal. The marinated pork is stir-fried in a pan coated with cooking oil, then the kimchi, the green chili, the onions, and a drizzle of sesame oil are added sequentially. Mo-dubu (firm tofu) is blanched, sliced into rectangles, and served with the stir-fried kimchi and pork when hot. Toasted sesame seeds are often sprinkled on top.

See also 
 List of tofu dishes

References 

Kimchi dishes
Tofu dishes